22 m² is the debut studio album by Finnish rapper Sini Sabotage. Released on 5 December 2013 via PME Records, the album peaked at number 27 on the Finnish Albums Chart.

Singles

Two singles preceded the album. "Levikset repee", released on 19 April 2013, peaked at number one on the Finnish Singles Chart. The second single "Miks" was released on 1 November 2013 and reached number 14.

Track listing

Charts

Release history

References

2013 albums
Finnish-language albums